Gerrard Bantu Buabo is an English professional footballer who plays as a forward for  club Ipswich Town.

Career
Buabo helped the youth-team at Ipswich Town to reach the semi-finals of the FA Youth Cup in the 2020–21 campaign. On 10 September 2021, he joined Bury Town on loan after Ben Chenery's side hit an injury crisis. He made his first-team debut at Ipswich Town on 20 September 2022, coming on as an 86th-minute substitute for Freddie Ladapo in a 2–0 win over Arsenal U21 in the EFL Trophy. He turned professional with the club two months later.

Career statistics

References

Living people
English footballers
Association football forwards
Ipswich Town F.C. players
Bury Town F.C. players
Isthmian League players
English Football League players
Black British sportsmen
Year of birth missing (living people)